Provincial Road 256 (PR 256) is a provincial road in the southwest corner of Manitoba, Canada.  At a length of 160 kilometres, it is among the longer provincial roads in Manitoba.

PR 256 begins as a gravel road at PTH 41 near McAuley and winds its way south, staying within 10 miles of the Saskatchewan border.  After it crosses the Trans-Canada Highway at Elkhorn, PR 256 becomes a paved, two-lane highway and continues south to the Lyleton Port of Entry at the Antler–Lyleton Border Crossing on the Canada–United States border, located south of Pierson, in the extreme southwest corner of Manitoba.

After crossing the international border, PR 256 becomes North Dakota Highway 256.

In 2014, the Canada Border Services Agency moved into a new state-of-the-art facility at Lyleton, which is the most westerly Port of Entry into Manitoba, located only three miles from the Saskatchewan boundary.

References

External links 
Manitoba Official Map

256